Mohamad Fuzi bin Harun (Jawi: محمد فوزي هارون; born 4 May 1959) is a retired Malaysian police officer who served as the 11th Inspector-General of Police of Malaysia (IGP). He was also former acting Deputy Inspector-General of Police of Malaysia and director of the Special Branch (SB) of the Royal Malaysia Police (PDRM).

Career 
Fuzi joined the police force as Cadet Assistant Superintendent of Police.

1. 1986-1992 - Special Branch (Social Intelligence)

2. 1992-1994 - Continue Learning

3. 1994-1997 - Special Branch of the Secretariat Division

4. 1998-2005 - Head of Special Branch, Sabah Contingent Police Headquarters

5. 2005-2007 - Special Branch (Political Intelligence)

6. 2007-2009 - Deputy Director II Special Branch, Bukit Aman

7. 2009-2014 - Director of Special Task Force (Counter Terrorism), Bukit Aman

8. 2014-2015 - Director of Managing Department, Bukit Aman

9. 2015-2017 - Director of Special Branch, Bukit Aman

10. 2017-2019 - Inspector General of Police

Honours

Honours of Malaysia
  :
  Officer of the Order of the Defender of the Realm (KMN) (2000)
  Commander of the Order of Meritorious Service (PJN) - Datuk (2012)
  Commander of the Order of the Defender of the Realm (PMN) - Tan Sri (2017)
 Royal Malaysia Police :
 Courageous Commander of the Most Gallant Police Order (PGPP) (2009)
  :
  Knight Companion of the Order of the Crown of Pahang (DIMP) - Dato' (2004)
  Grand Knight of the Order of the Crown of Pahang (SIMP) - Dato' Indera (2008)
  Grand Knight of the Order of Sultan Ahmad Shah of Pahang (SSAP) - Dato' Sri (2016)
  :
 Distinguished Service Star (BCM) (2003)
  Knight Commander of the Exalted Order of Malacca (DCSM) - Datuk Wira (2016)
  :
  Member of the Order of Cura Si Manja Kini (ACM) (2003)
  Knight Grand Commander of the Order of Taming Sari (SPTS) - Dato' Seri Panglima (2012)
  :
  Commander of the Order of Kinabalu (PGDK) - Datuk (2015)
  Grand Commander of the Order of Kinabalu (SPDK) - Datuk Seri Panglima (2017)

Foreign honours
 :
  National Police Meritorious Service Star 1st Class (BB) (2018)

 :
  Meritorious Service Medal (PJG) (2017)
  Distinguished Service Order (DUBC) (2019)

References 

1959 births
Living people
Malaysian police chiefs
Malaysian police officers
Commanders of the Order of Kinabalu
Grand Commanders of the Order of Kinabalu
Malaysian people of Malay descent
National University of Malaysia alumni
University of Malaya alumni
Malaysian Muslims
People from Perak
Officers of the Order of the Defender of the Realm
Recipients of the Pingat Jasa Gemilang
Commanders of the Order of Meritorious Service
Commanders of the Order of the Defender of the Realm
Recipients of the Darjah Utama Bakti Cemerlang